Yang Banban (born 26 April 1989) is a Chinese basketball player. She represented China at the 2010 FIBA World Championship for Women.

Yang Banban is the daughter of footballer Yang Yumin and basketball player/coach Wang Guizhi (currently the head coach of Xinjiang Magic Deer).

References

Living people
1989 births
Basketball players from Shenyang
Chinese women's basketball players
Point guards
Liaoning Flying Eagles players
Beijing Great Wall players
Asian Games medalists in basketball
Basketball players at the 2014 Asian Games
Asian Games silver medalists for China
Medalists at the 2014 Asian Games